Miao Boying was a Chinese teacher, writer and revolutionary who became the first woman to join the Communist Party of China. She was a founding member of China's Woman's Rights League and was later became secretary of the Hunan Communist Women's Committee.

Life
Miao was born in 1899 in Changsha, Hunan Province. She went to First Girls' Normal School, passing  an entrance exam allowing her to attend Beijing Normal Women's College (now known as Beijing Normal University). While here she met her future husband and Hunan native He Mengxiong who was studying at the nearby Peking University. After suspending her studies she became involved with the Work-Study Mutual Aid Corp which was set up by future communist party founders Deng Zhongxia and Li Dazhao to promote Marxist ideas.

In November 1920 she formally joined the newly establish Communist Youth League of China headed by Yu Xiusong and started publishing articles about the roles women play in the family. Later that month a split within the party saw some member who supported anarchism leave, to strengthen the party Miao who was the first woman to join the group, recruited five members from other CYL chapters. At the age of 21, Miao left the Communist Youth League and joined the Chinese Communist Party, again becoming its first female member.

A few years later she founded the Women's Right League and traveled across China with her husband He Mengxiong to promote the organisation. In 1924 she was sent back to Hunan by party leaders to become secretary of the Hunan Communist Women's Committee. In 1929 Miao died at Paulun Hospital in Shanghai of typhoid fever.

References

1899 births
1929 deaths
Writers from Changsha
Chinese women's rights activists
Educators from Hunan
People of the Republic of China